Jayson Daniels (born 19 February 1971) is a former Australian rules footballer who played in the VFL/AFL.

Debuting in the VFL in 1988, he was recruited from Parkmore, Victoria to the St Kilda Football Club. The red-headed Daniels, known as "Jack", was used in a number of defensive roles. In 1993 he debuted for the Sydney Swans, where he played until 1995. In 1996 he moved back to his original AFL team, the St Kilda Football Club. He was injured with a shoulder problem in 1997 and his final season of AFL was in 1998. Daniels played 173 AFL games in total.

References

External links 

1971 births
Living people
St Kilda Football Club players
Sydney Swans players
Australian rules footballers from Victoria (Australia)